"Caroline" is a single released by the British rock band Status Quo in 1973. It was included on the band's 1973 album Hello!

Background and release
The song was written by band leader Francis Rossi and roadie / harmonica player Bob Young on a table napkin in the dining room of a hotel in Perranporth, Cornwall, in 1971. A demo was cut with Rossi playing guitar and bass, with Terry Williams on drums. The group changed the arrangement from a slow blues song, doubling the tempo, and recorded it mostly live using their stage gear and amplifiers. On the single release, the song fades out, while the album version is about thirty seconds longer and has a conclusive ending.

The song became one of the opening numbers in Quo's live setlist for over 25 years. It was the second number played at their Live Aid gig in 1985 and it inspired Apollo 440's 1999 single "Stop the Rock".

The song was reprised, in 2014, for the band's thirty-first studio album Aquostic (Stripped Bare). It was featured in the ninety-minute launch performance of the album at London's Roundhouse on 22 October, the concert being recorded and broadcast live by BBC Radio 2 as part of their In Concert series.

Singles
 1973: "Caroline" (Rossi/Young) (3.43) / "Joanne" (Lancaster) (4.06) 45 rpm Vinyl 7", Vertigo / 6059 085  Germany,  United Kingdom 
 1985: "Caroline" / "Down Down" 45 rpm Vinyl 7", Old Gold / OG 9566  United Kingdom

Album tracks
 1973, on the vinyl album Hello! - track 5, 4:16.
 2014, on the album Aquostic (Stripped Bare), track 8, 3:13 (acoustic version)
 2015, on the CD album Hello!, CD1, track 5, 4:16; the 2015 re-issue bonus disc has four different versions: original demo fast, original demo slow, mono version and stereo version.

Charts

Original Release

Live Version

Certifications

References 

Status Quo (band) songs
1973 singles
1982 singles
Songs written by Francis Rossi
Songs written by Bob Young (musician)
1973 songs
Vertigo Records singles